Andrzej Gryczko is a Polish sprint canoer who competed in the early 1990s. He won two silver medals in the K-4 10000 m event at the ICF Canoe Sprint World Championships, earning them in 1990 and 1993.

References

Living people
Polish male canoeists
Year of birth missing (living people)
Place of birth missing (living people)
ICF Canoe Sprint World Championships medalists in kayak